The River Evelix is a river in Sutherland, Scotland. To its south is the Kyle of Sutherland and to its west the River Shin. It passes through farmland, the village of Evelix, and the estuary of Loch Evelix. It enters the sea at Meikle Ferry on the Dornoch Firth, just west of the north end of the Dornoch Bridge.

External links
https://kylefisheries.org/rivers/evelix/

Evelix